Danilo Gustavo Vergne Gomes (born 15 October 1981) is a Brazilian former football player.

Club career statistics

References

External links

jsgoal

1981 births
Living people
Brazilian footballers
Brazilian expatriate footballers
Esporte Clube Bahia players
Sport Club Internacional players
J1 League players
FC Tokyo players
Paulista Futebol Clube players
Red Bull Brasil players
Club León footballers
Salgueiro Atlético Clube players
Clube Atlético Bragantino players
Treze Futebol Clube players
Expatriate footballers in Japan
Expatriate footballers in Mexico
Association football midfielders
Sportspeople from Salvador, Bahia